The Voice of Bulgaria (Bulgarian: Гласът на България, transcribed as Glasat na Bulgaria) is a Bulgarian reality singing competition and local version of The Voice of Holland. Its first season was held in the summer of 2011 on bTV.

One of the show's important premises is the singing talent's quality. Four coaches (popular performing artists) train the talents in their group and occasionally perform with them. Talents are selected in blind auditions, where the coaches cannot see, but only hear the auditioner.

The first season started airing on 18 July 2011 and ended on 24th October 2011. Until now, this show has aired for nine seasons. In July 2021, btv announced the eighth season, which aired in the fall of 2021, with Ivan Lechev return as a coach, with new coaches Dara, Galena and Lubo Kirov. The same coaches were announced to return for the ninth season in the fall of 2022.

Format 
The series consists of three phases: a blind audition, a battle phase, and live performance shows. Starting season 4, a Knockout round is implemented for a total of four phases.

Blind auditions 
In this stage, four coaches, all noteworthy recording artists, choose teams of contestants by pressing the button to turn. Each judge has the length of the auditioner's performance (about one minute) to decide if he or she wants that singer on his or her team; if two or more coaches want the same singer (as happens frequently), the singer has the final choice of coach.

Twists in blind auditions were then added. Starting season 4, when the contestant fails to turn any of the coaches, the contestant would straight go away from the stage, and the coach's chair remains unturned. In season 6 onwards, a new element is added to give coaches new power, the "Block" button. Three new smaller white buttons with the name of other coaches, in addition to the red button, allow coaches to block one of the coaches to prevent them from claiming the talent. Coaches are entitled to only one "Block" for the entire blind auditions (raised to two from season 8 onwards). In season 7, when the blocked coach tries to turn around for the contestant, the chair of the blocked coach won't turn around, but that blocking rule change was removed in the next season. However, the blocking coach will lose the opportunity to block again if the blocked coach does not press his main red button or turn around.

From season 8 onwards, coaches have the freedom to select an unlimited number of contestants for their respective teams. However, the number of contestants on the team will be finalized by cutting them down to 14 contestants per team (12 in season 9) by selecting randomly by their coach to proceed into battle rounds.

Battles 
Each team of singers is mentored and developed by its respective coach. In the second stage, called the battles, coaches pair their team into two or three (which happened in season 7) of their team members battle against each other directly by singing the same song together, with the coach choosing which team member to advance from each of four individual "battles" into the next round, the Knockout rounds. However, starting season 3, a new power is added to the coach during the phase, the steal. Each coach is given two (one in season 6 and 8) steals to save the artist from another team who lose their respective battle. In season 9, the non-stop steal is featured, which means that steals during the battle rounds follow a hot-seat procedure: each artist that is stolen this season will sit in a designated seat backstage as they watch the other performances. If a coach has stolen one artist but later decides to steal another, the first artist will be replaced and eliminated by the newly-stolen artist.

Super Battles (Season 4-5) / Knockouts (Season 6-8) 
Super Battles round is implemented starting season 4. The participants who remained after the vocal battles are grouped by the mentor into trios. Each artist had to sing in order to convince their respective coach to pick them for the Live shows. Each artist will decide on what song they will sing. After the performance, the coach would decide who to advance to the Live shows. In season six the Knockouts replaced the Super Battles. In this round, three chairs are placed on the stage to be seated by contestants. After the artist performs the song of their choice, the coach will decide if the artist will be going forward to the next round by giving them a chair or if the artist will go home by not giving them a chair. If the three chairs are filled and the coach wants to give a chair to another artist, they are sitting on the given chair and the person previously sitting on it is eliminated. At the end of this round, three artists per team will be moved to the Live shows.

Live shows 
Within that first live round, the surviving four acts from each team again compete head-to-head, with public votes determining one of two acts from each team that will advance to the final eight, while the coach chooses which of the remaining three acts comprises the other performer remaining on the team.

In season eight, a new stage was introduced, the Cross-Battles. In this round, an artist would be sent by his or her coach to compete against an artist from another team. The selection of the artists and their order of appearance were all decided by their respective coaches, and all of them were done without the knowledge of the opposing coach. Therefore, the battle pairings were completely random, and would only be revealed when the coaches appeared with their selected artists on stage, and the winner of the battle would be determined via public votes.

During the Cross-Battle round, this would not guarantee the coaches that they would have a remaining contestant to fight for in the final, which happened for the first time in the show with Lubo Kirov's team in the eighth season.

In the final phase, the remaining contestants compete against each other in live broadcasts. With one team member remaining for each coach, the contestants compete against each other in the finale with the outcome decided solely by public vote.

Coaches

Coaches' teams 
 Winner
 Runner-up
 Third place
 Fourth place

Coaches' timeline

Coaches' advisors

Presenters 
 Key
 Main presenter
 TV backstage presenter
 Online backstage presenter

Series overview 
 Color key is present on the section #Coaches' timeline.

Warning: the following table presents a significant amount of different colors.

See also
 The Voice (TV series)

References

External links
 Glasat na Bulgaria Previous website

 Glasat na Bulgaria Official website

2010s Bulgarian television series
Bulgaria
Bulgarian television series
2011 Bulgarian television series debuts
Bulgarian-language television shows
BTV (Bulgaria) original programming